Simone Campagnaro (born 31 May 1986 in Latina, in the Lazio region, central Italy) is an Italian road bicycle racer currently riding for .

Palmares highlights

2011

3rd Overall Tour de Hokkaido

2012
4th Overall Tour de la Guadeloupe
1st Stage 4

2013
4th Overall Tour de Kumano
7th Gran Premio Nobili Rubinetterie

References

External links

 Simone Campagnaro on Cicloweb
 Team Nippo: News

Italian male cyclists
Tour de Guadeloupe stage winners
1986 births
Living people
Sportspeople from the Province of Latina
Cyclists from Lazio